Emanuel Buchmann (born 18 November 1992) is a German professional racing cyclist, who currently rides for UCI WorldTeam . In 2015 he won the German National Road Race Championships. He has competed in the Tour de France six times, finishing fourth in 2019, and twice in the Vuelta a España, in 2017 and 2018.

Career
Buchmann is the son of carpenter Manfred Buchmann and hails from Vogt near Ravensburg in the German state of Baden-Württemberg. , he lives in Bregenz, Austria.

Bora–Argon 18 (2015–present)

2015 

In 2015, Buchmann denied the strong sprinters their chance at the German National Road Race Championships when he attacked from a leading group to take the title. During the subsequent Tour de France, he finished a strong third on the stage finishing at the top of the Col du Tourmalet.

2017 

After a quieter 2016 season, he finished tenth at the 2017 Tour de Romandie, losing a podium position only during the race's final stage time trial. Buchmann then finished seventh overall and first in the young riders' classification at the Critérium du Dauphiné, one of the major preparation races for the Tour de France. During the last stage, he finished ahead of strong general classification riders such as Chris Froome, Alejandro Valverde and Alberto Contador at Plateau de Solaison. Buchmann commented after the stage that he was delighted to have been able to "stay with the best" of the race. At the German National Road Race Championships the week after, Buchmann set up the victory for his teammate Marcus Burghardt, finishing in second place. His form faded slightly at the Tour de France, where he was set to work for team leader Rafał Majka, who withdrew early; he eventually finished in 15th place overall.

2018 
Buchmann opened the season strong, with a 10th place overall at the Abu Dhabi Tour. He followed that up with his best result, at that time, 4th at the Tour of the Basque Country. He finished 9th at the Tour de Romandie, and 18th at the Eschborn–Frankfurt race. At the Critérium du Dauphiné in June, Buchmann finished sixth in the general classification, repeating his strong performance from the previous year. He attacked multiple times on the final stage, but was brought back and finished the stage fourth. He was selected to ride the Vuelta a España. He performed well in the opening stages. On stage 4, he attacked the group of favourites on the finishing climb of Alfacar, gaining time which moved him into second place overall, within seven seconds of the race lead. After falling back during the subsequent mountain stages, Buchmann eventually finished the Vuelta in 12th place overall, his best result in a Grand Tour up to that point.

2019
Buchmann raced the Tour of the Basque Country, winning stage 5 after attacking on the penultimate climb of the day to take the overall lead. He lost the leader's jersey on the final stage of the race. In the closing metres, Buchmann took a wrong turn and lost significant time. The time he lost through this was later reinstated, meaning that he finished the race in third overall. At the Tour de Romandie, Buchmann finished seventh overall.

In preparation for the upcoming Tour de France, Buchmann raced the Critérium du Dauphiné, where he finished third overall, after Adam Yates abandoned the event during the final stage, handing the podium spot to Buchmann. He remained in good form all the way through the Tour, answering nearly every attack by the elite general classification riders. By the time the race reached the Champs-Élysées, he was barely two minutes behind race leader Egan Bernal, just off the podium in fourth place.

2020
Buchmann started his 2020 season strongly, winning the Trofeo de Tramuntana, the second leg of the Challenge Mallorca. He was part of a breakaway that formed on the penultimate climb of the day and used the descent to create a gap, which he held to the finish. His last race before the season was interrupted by the COVID-19 pandemic was the UAE Tour, which he was forced to abandon after a crash. His next objectives after racing resumed were the Critérium du Dauphiné before leading his team at the Tour de France. At the Dauphiné, Buchmann was third overall when a crash on stage four forced him to withdraw. The injuries he sustained put his Tour de France participation in doubt, but he eventually started the race, finishing 38th overall.

2021
For 2021, Buchmann initially chose to forgo the Tour de France, due to its route not suiting his strengths, containing too many time trials and too little mountain-top finishes. He decided to compete at the Giro d'Italia instead. Following a poor opening time trial and losing some seconds during the first mountain stages, Buchmann came into his own on stage 11 over gravel roads, launching an attack that only Egan Bernal was able to follow, elevating himself into sixth place in the process. He rode strongly on stage 14 as well, ending on the Monte Zoncolan, keeping his overall position. However, a mass crash early during stage 15 saw Buchmann fall. While he was able to stand afterwards, the race doctor made the decision to pull Buchmann from the race. He was brought to hospital, where a light concussion and bruises to the face and hip were diagnosed. In June, Buchmann was added to 's Tour de France squad, riding in support of team leader Wilco Kelderman.

Major results

2010
 9th Ronde van Vlaanderen Junioren
 10th Overall Tour du Valromey
2012
 6th Overall Tour d'Azerbaïdjan
2014
 3rd Overall Okolo Jižních Čech
1st Stage 3
 7th Overall Tour de l'Avenir
 7th GP Capodarco
 8th Overall Tour d'Azerbaïdjan
 8th Overall Mzansi Tour
2015
 1st  Road race, National Road Championships
 1st Stage 1 (TTT) Giro del Trentino
2016
 4th Rudi Altig Race
 8th Overall Giro del Trentino
2017
 2nd Road race, National Road Championships
 6th Trofeo Serra de Tramuntana
 7th Overall Critérium du Dauphiné
1st  Young rider classification
 7th Overall Tour of the Alps
 10th Overall Tour de Romandie
 10th Vuelta a Murcia
2018
 4th Overall Tour of the Basque Country
 6th Overall Critérium du Dauphiné
 7th Overall Tour de Pologne
 9th Overall Tour de Romandie
 10th Overall Abu Dhabi Tour
2019
 1st Trofeo Andratx–Lloseta
 2nd Trofeo Serra de Tramuntana
 3rd Overall Tour of the Basque Country
1st Stage 5
 3rd Overall Critérium du Dauphiné
 4th Overall Tour de France
 4th Overall UAE Tour
 4th Gran Piemonte
 7th Overall Tour de Romandie
 8th Giro di Lombardia
2020
 1st Trofeo Serra de Tramuntana
 9th Pollença–Andratx
2021
 4th Road race, National Road Championships
2022
 4th Road race, National Road Championships
 5th Circuito de Getxo
 6th Trofeo Serra de Tramuntana
 7th Overall Giro d'Italia
 9th Trofeo Calvià
2023
 9th Overall UAE Tour
 10th Trofeo Andratx–Mirador D'es Colomer

General classification results timeline

References

External links

 

1992 births
Living people
German male cyclists
People from Ravensburg
Sportspeople from Tübingen (region)
German cycling road race champions
Cyclists at the 2016 Summer Olympics
Cyclists at the 2020 Summer Olympics
Olympic cyclists of Germany
Cyclists from Baden-Württemberg
20th-century German people
21st-century German people